Balwant is a given name. Notable people with the name include:

Balwant Gargi (1916–2003), Punjabi dramatist, novelist, and short story writer
Balwant Singh of Bharatpur (1820–1853), the ruling Maharaja of princely state Bharatpur from 1825
Dattatray Balwant Parasnis (1870–1926), historian from Maharashtra, India
Vasudeo Balwant Phadke (1845–1883), Indian revolutionary in the armed struggle for India's independence
Balwant Singh Rakkha (born 1941), Fiji Indian medical doctor and a member of the House of Representatives of Fiji
Balwant Singh Ramoowalia (born 1942), active politician and president of Lok Bhalai Party (LBP)

See also
Balwant Rai Mehat Vidya Bhawan, co-educational high school in Lajpat Nagar in South Delhi
Balwant Rai Mehta Committee, committee appointed by the Government of India in 1957